Čađavica (Cyrillic: Чађавица) is a name of three different subdivisions located west of the city of Bijeljina in Republika Srpska, Bosnia and Herzegovina. The three different subdivisions are Čađavica Donja, Čađavica Gornja, and Čađavica Srednja.

External links
 Bijeljina official website (Serbian)

Bijeljina